Family dog may refer to:

A dog suited for a family; also known as a Companion dog
The Family Dogg, a British vocal group
Family Dog (TV series) a short-lived American TV series
Family Dog Productions, also known as The Family Dog, a music promotion group run by Chet Helms in San Francisco
The Family Dog, a concert hall in the Richmond District, San Francisco run by Family Dog Productions, in operation during the late 1960s